Anatole Shub (May 19, 1928 in The Bronx, New York City – July 2, 2006 in Washington, D.C.) was an American author, journalist, researcher, editor, news director and Russian public opinion analyst.

Shub attended Townsend Harris High School and then joined the US Navy in 1945. He graduated from the City College of New York and attended the Medill School of Journalism at Northwestern University and the Graduate School of Journalism at Columbia University.

His first jobs in journalism included writing and then editing at The New Leader, a leftist but anti-communist magazine whose editor was his brother-in-law, Melvin J. Lasky, and associate editor at Commentary. Next, he was an editor at The New York Times, where he won a fellowship from the Institute of Current World Affairs, which allowed him to travel in the Soviet Union and Eastern Europe.

In 1964, he was hired by The Washington Post to open a bureau in Bonn and report on Germany and Eastern Europe. Next, he was moved to the Moscow bureau, where his reporting on dissidents and the political role of the army got him expelled in 1969.

More recently, Shub was news director at Radio Free Europe and analyst for the United States Information Agency, studying Russian public opinion.

Shub was married to Joyce Lasky (sister of Floria Lasky) with whom he had a son and daughter; they later divorced. He then married the author Barbara (née Bellman) Raskin, the former wife of progressive social critic Marcus Raskin; the marriage also ended in divorce.

Shub died of a stroke and pneumonia at age 78.

Selected publications

Bibliography and References 
 
 

1928 births
2006 deaths
American political writers
American male journalists
Journalists from New York City
American editors
United States Navy personnel of World War II
Columbia University Graduate School of Journalism alumni
Medill School of Journalism alumni
City College of New York alumni
Townsend Harris High School alumni
Deaths from pneumonia in Washington, D.C.